Al-Sikak Sport Club, is an Iraqi football team based in Baghdad, that plays in the Iraq Division Two.

Managerial history
  Sameer Yassin

See also 
 2021–22 Iraq Division Two

References

External links
 Iraq Clubs- Foundation Dates

Railway association football teams
2010 establishments in Iraq
Association football clubs established in 2010
Football clubs in Baghdad